Henry Meyners Bernard (29 November 1853 in Singapore – 4 January 1909 in London) was a British biologist, carcinologist, palaeontologist, mathematician and cleric, and an authority on solifuges, corals and trilobites. He was the third of six children born to Alfred George Farquhar Bernard and Elizabeth Antoinette Moor.

After graduating from Corpus Christi College, Cambridge, Bernard served curacies in Wells and Herefordshire before six years as chaplain of the English Church in Moscow, which he left to study biology and zoology under Professor Ernst Haeckel at Jena (promoter of Darwin's work and proponent of the 'recapitulation theory'). Bernard then catalogued corals and fossils at the British Museum, publishing numerous papers and monographs. In addition he wrote 'The Sense of Sight: Sketch of a New Theory' (1896), 'A Suggested Origin of the Segmented Worms', and 'The Problem of Metamerism' (1900), 'Studies in the Retina' (1906) and co-authored a 'Texbook of Comparative Anatomy' (1896). He became a Fellow of the Linnean and Zoological Societies. He was a socialist, and wrote The Scientific Basis of Socialism: Two Essays in Evolution (New Age Press 1908). He died at 109, West End Lane, London, N.W.

The crustacean family Apodidae was later renamed Triopsidae as it duplicated the family name used for swifts.

Personal life
He married on 19 November 1883 in Vienna, Austria to Maida Mirrielees, Russian-born daughter of Archibald Mirrielees, founder of Muir & Mirrielees Co. (later renamed TsUM), a high end department store in Moscow. They had three children 
Una Mirrilees Bernard b. 11 April 1886
Ida Bernard b. 11 July 1888
Maude Bernard b. 26 March 1890, d. 1945

His youngest brother Charles Grant Bugden Bernard was the great-great grandfather of Justin Trudeau, 23rd Prime Minister of Canada.

Close friends
Rudyard Kipling

Works
1893 Trilobites with Antennae. (Nature.)
1894 Systematic Position of the Trilobites. (GEOL. MAG., 1894, p. 230- 1895 p. 280.)
1894 Systematic Position of the Trilobites. (Quart. Journ. Geol. Soc, vol. 1, p. 411.)
1894 Trilobites developed by the Sandblast. (GEOL. MAR. 1894, p. 553.)
1895 The Zoological Position of the Trilobites. (Science Progress.) 
1896 The comparative morphology of the Galeodidae - Transactions of the Linnean Society of London
1897 Fossil Apodidae. (Natural Science.)
1897 Natural history - R. Lydekker, W. F. Kirby, B. B. Woodward, R. Kirpatrick, R. I. Pocock, R. Bowdler Sharpe, W. Garstang, F. A. Bather, H. M. Bernard
On the Affinities of the Madreporarian genus Alveopora with the Palaeozoic Favositidae. (Journ. Linnean Soc, Zool.)

References

External links
 The Apodidae - A Morphological Study (1892)
 Letter from Alfred Russel Wallace to Bernard
 Archive works

1853 births
1909 deaths
Singaporean emigrants to the United Kingdom
Alumni of Corpus Christi College, Cambridge
British carcinologists
Fellows of the Linnean Society of London
Fellows of the Zoological Society of London